The Khojak Tunnel (Khojak Sarang), is a  railway tunnel in the Toba Achakzai range in the Qilla Abdullah District of Balochistan province, Pakistan. The tunnel was constructed in 1891 under the Khojak Pass, and was featured on the old Five Rupee banknote.

The tunnel is one of the longest tunnels in South Asia, and was the longest in Pakistan until superseded by the  Lowari Tunnel in 2018.

History
The tunnel was constructed in 1891 under the Khojak Pass and remains one of the longest tunnels in South Asia, and the second longest in Pakistan, having been surpassed in length by the Lowari Pass in 2018. 

It was featured on the old Rs. 5 banknote.

It was constructed in 3 years and it is so straight that a mirror can be used to reflect light at one end which is visible from the other.

The major railway line track laying and labour contractor was Waja Durra Khan Baloch from Karachi who originally migrated from Baho Kalat in early 1600s and got his first contract when British were working on Karachi Port. Later on he was awarded various railway contracts from Balochistan to Banglor and later Rangoon Burma. Later British awarded his son Waja Fakir Muhammad Durra Khan the status of honorary judge in Karachi city court and after his death a road named after him from badshahi road to 8 chowk Lyari.

Gallery

References

Further reading

 Mughal, Owais. Khojak Tunnel Pakistaniat.com December 18, 2006

Railway tunnels
Balochistan
Tunnels completed in 1891
1891 establishments in British India
Railway tunnels in Pakistan